The 2003 ICF Canoe Sprint World Championships were held September 10–14, 2003 in Gainesville, Georgia, United States at Lake Lanier. Located north of Atlanta, this was also where the canoe sprint and rowing events for the 1996 Summer Olympics took place.

The men's competition consisted of nine Canadian (single paddle, open boat) and nine kayak events. Women competed in nine events, all in kayak.

This was the 33rd championships in canoe sprint.

Doping controversy
Sergey Ulegin of Russia won two golds (C-4 200 m, C-4 500 m) and one silver (C-2 500 m), but was stripped of those medals when he tested positive for doping. His teammates in the C-2 500 m (Aleksandr Kostoglod), C-4 200 m (Kostoglod, Roman Kruglyakov, and Maksim Opalev), and C-4 500 m (Kostoglod, Kruglyakov, and Opalev) events also lost their medals as a result of Ulegin's positive test. Ulegin received a two-year suspension.

Medal summary

Men's
 Non-Olympic classes

Canoe

Kayak

Women's
 Non-Olympic classes

Kayak

Medal table

References
ICF medalists for Olympic and World Championships - Part 1: flatwater (now sprint): 1936-2007.
ICF medalists for Olympic and World Championships - Part 2: rest of flatwater (now sprint) and remaining canoeing disciplines: 1936-2007.
ICF Executive Committee December 12, 2003 decision on Ulegin's doping case at the championships. – accessed August 20, 2008.
Official website

Icf Canoe Sprint World Championships, 2003
ICF Canoe Sprint World Championships
International sports competitions hosted by the United States
Icf Canoe Sprint World Championships, 2003
Canoeing and kayaking competitions in the United States
Sports competitions in Georgia (U.S. state)